"Overtime" is a single of the British musical group, Level 42, from the 1991 album, Guaranteed. It was written by Mike Lindup, Mark King and Drew Barfield. It reached number 62 in the UK Singles Chart.

The music video was filmed in black and white and set in a factory.

Personnel
Mark King - Bass/Vocals/Guitars
Mike Lindup - Keyboards/Vocals
Gary Husband - Drums
Wally Badarou - Keyboards
Gary Barnacle - Saxophone

1991 singles
Level 42 songs
Songs written by Mark King (musician)
Songs written by Mike Lindup
1991 songs